Troy Adam Drake (born May 15, 1972) is a former American football offensive tackle in the National Football League for the Philadelphia Eagles and the Washington Redskins.  He played college football at Indiana University.

1972 births
Living people
People from Byron, Illinois
American football offensive tackles
Indiana Hoosiers football players
Philadelphia Eagles players
Washington Redskins players